The Contemporary Dance Company of Angola (CDC) is a professional Angolan dance group. They were founded in 1991.

References

External links
 

Angolan culture
Angola, Contemporary Dance Company of
1991 establishments in Angola
Performing groups established in 1991